The East Arkansas Regional Unit is an Arkansas Department of Correction prison in Brickeys, St. Francis Township, unincorporated Lee County, Arkansas. United States.

East Arkansas Regional Unit is one of the state's parent units for processed male inmates and serves for initial assignment. This facility was established in 1992 and has 379 employees. The facility is ACA Accredited and has a capacity of 1,432 inmates. Operations include jail operations, education, substance abuse treatment program, canine unit, field crops, and regional maintenance.

In 2007 after the prison system determined that some East Arkansas Correctional Officers used excessive force against prisoners, those Correctional Officers were fired.

Notable prisoners
 Joshua Macave Brown, perpetrator of the murder of Jesse Dirkhising

References

External links

 East Arkansas Regional Unit - Arkansas Department of Correction

Prisons in Arkansas
Buildings and structures in Lee County, Arkansas
1992 establishments in Arkansas